Mertensophryne howelli (common name: Mrora forest toad) is a species of toad in the family Bufonidae. It is endemic to the coast of Tanzania and known from the Mafia Island and Zanzibar. The species is named after professor Kim Howell for his contributions to the herpetology of Tanzania.

Description
The male paratype measured  in snout to urostyle tip length.

The top of the head is flat, as typical for species of the formerly recognized genus Stephopuedes. Parotoid glands are flattened and broad. Dorsal and lateral skin of head and parotoid region are densely covered with sharply pointed, light-tipped spines, which are especially densely packed on canthus and lateral edge of eyelids. Spines on loreal region are fewer and smaller. Colouration is generally dark brown, with a light upper lip and snout tip and a light middorsal line over the urostyle.

Habitat and conservation
It is a terrestrial toad inhabiting lowland coastal forest, showing some degree of adaptability to living in degraded habitats. On Mafia Island, its habitat is being degraded rapidly for agriculture, wood extraction, and human settlements. It occurs in the Jozani Chwaka Bay National Park on Zanzibar.

References

howelli
Endemic fauna of Tanzania
Amphibians of Tanzania
Amphibians described in 1999
Taxonomy articles created by Polbot